The Little Silver River is a  tributary of the Sturgeon River in Houghton County on the Upper Peninsula of Michigan in the United States.

See also
List of rivers of Michigan

References

Michigan Streamflow Data from the USGS

Rivers of Michigan
Rivers of Houghton County, Michigan